Lhoksukon is a town in Aceh province of Indonesia and it is the seat (capital) of North Aceh Regency.

Notable people
Azriana Manalu, women's rights activist

Climate
Lhoksukon has a tropical rainforest climate (Af) with moderate to heavy rainfall year-round.

References

North Aceh Regency
Populated places in Aceh
Regency seats of Aceh